Entreprise à mission is a French legal framework in which businesses pursue a set social and environmental purpose with specific sustainability goals.

References 

Benefit corporations
Business in France